Pipestone Area High School is the only public high school in Pipestone, Minnesota, United States. The high school is part of the Pipestone Area School District, Independent School District #2689. As of August 2017, there were 324 students enrolled in grades 912. A new  facility, which houses grades 512 and the school district administration, was opened in January 2003 at the cost of $22.3 million. The campus is located on Minnesota State Highway 30 on the west end of Pipestone.

Academics
Pipestone Area High School does not require the study of a foreign language, although it is highly recommended.  Current languages offered are French and Spanish.  PAHS also offers a variety of Advanced Placement classes, including AP Calculus, AP Chemistry and AP English Language and Composition.  An accelerated math program is offered to selected students, starting in tenth grade.  Other classes offered (some required), aside from the general core classes, are technology education, government, sociology, keyboarding, economics, family and consumer science (FACS), agriculture, art, band, choir.  PSEO classes can be taken by qualifying students at Minnesota West Community & Technical College, which has a campus in Pipestone.

Extracurricular activities
All students are offered their choice of extracurricular activities, if they choose to participate.  Academic extracurricular activities of notable mention include Math Team, Knowledge Bowl, Marching band, Student Council, Peer Helping, One Act Play, Drama, Speech, FFA, among others.

Board of Education
The Board of Education is made up of seven people residing within the school district elected by the voters to make major decisions, including financial decisions, personnel authorizations and educational policy.

Athletics
In 2007, the Pipestone Area girls' basketball team defeated the Albany Huskies, 50-49, at the Target Center in Minneapolis, Minnesota, to win its first Minnesota State High School League state championship in school history.

Pipestone Area participates in The Big South Conference.

Football 
Each year, the Pipestone Area football team plays nearby Luverne in a rivalry dating back to 1957. The winner of the annual game receives a traveling trophy known as the 'Battle Ax'.

Results

Team sports

References

External links
 Pipestone Area School District official website

Educational institutions established in 1897
Public high schools in Minnesota
Schools in Pipestone County, Minnesota
1897 establishments in Minnesota